Jürgen Melzer and Philipp Petzschner were the defending champions but Melzer decided not to participate. Petzschner plays alongside Michael Kohlmann.
Jérémy Chardy and Łukasz Kubot won the title by beating Michal Mertiňák and André Sá 6–1, 6–3 in the final.

Seeds

Draw

Draw

References

External links
 Main draw

Stuttgart Open - Doubles
Doubles 2012